The China International Famine Relief Commission (CIFRC) was an organization dedicated to famine relief efforts in early 20th century China. The organization was founded on November 16, 1921.

See also
 Robert Jacquinot de Besange
 John Alexander Pope

Further reading
 A History of the China International Famine Relief Commission

References

Famines in China
Philanthropic organizations